Ancient and Primeval Beech Forests of the Carpathians and Other Regions of Europe is a transnational serial nature UNESCO World Heritage Site, encompassing 94 component parts (forests of European beech, Fagus sylvatica) in 18 European countries. Together, the sites protect the largest and least disturbed forests dominated by the beech tree. In many of these stands (especially those in the Carpathians), these forests here were allowed to proceed without interruption or interference since the last ice age. These sites document the undisturbed postglacial repopulation of the species.

Carpathian region

The Ancient Beech Forests of Germany include five locations, cover 4,391 hectares and were added in 2011.

Primeval Beech Forests of the Carpathians cover areas of Zakarpattia and Prešov Regions. Over 70% of the site is located in Ukraine. The area includes two national parks, and some habitat controlled areas, mostly in Slovakia. Both national parks, along with a neighboring area in Poland, compose a separate biosphere reserve, the East Carpathian Biosphere Reserve. Besides Havešová, Rožok, and Stužica (all of them located in Bukovské vrchy), there is a fourth component situated in Slovakia, named Kyjovský prales of Vihorlat. Ukrainian locations include Chornohora, Kuziy-Trybushany, Maramarosh, Stuzhytsia–Uzhok, Svydovets, and Uholka–Shyrikyi Luh. Only a few of the ten components are accessible to visitors. Stužica is the only one of three locations in Bukovské vrchy (Slovakia) with available hiking trails. In 2017, UNESCO extended the site, adding forests in Albania, Austria, Belgium, Bulgaria, Croatia, Italy, Romania, Slovenia, and Spain. In 2021 UNESCO extended the site again adding forests in Bosnia and Herzegovina, Czechia, France, Italy, North Macedonia, Poland,
Slovakia and Switzerland.

The last intact virgin forest in the temperate latitudes of Europe is to be found in the Carpathians. Trees can live to a hundred years old in these forests, providing an important habitat for organisms such as mushrooms, moss, lichen, insects, rare birds (e.g. capercaillie and black grouse) and mammals (e.g. bats, brown bear, wolf and lynx). Large parts of the forest in the Romanian part of the Carpathians have been lost due to deforestation. The pressure on timber as a resource may increase due to international demand and European companies may start large-scale felling in neighbouring Ukraine. Currently unprotected areas of virgin forest can be permanently preserved in the Ukrainian Carpathians by expanding and reinforcing conservation areas. In the Ukrainian Carpathians there are nine national parks and two biosphere reserves. There is a general ban on tree felling in coniferous forest areas above 1,100 metres. If park administrations are shown to work, management of larger, previously unprotected areas of virgin forest to preserve them on a permanent basis, may occur. There are roughly 100,000 additional hectares of forest which could be integrated into the existing conservation areas.

List of component parts

The component parts included in the site as of August 2021 are:

* Only boundary modification.

Udava (Bukovské Vrchy, Slovakia) was created by modifying the boundary of Stužica before. Falascone (Italy) in turn was named previously Umbra Forest (Foresta Umbra).

This is a transnational serial nature UNESCO World Heritage Site, encompassing 94 component parts (forests) in 18 European countries. The largest total area of component parts is in Ukraine and Romania – 54% total (41% including buffer zones).

Forms of protection
Component parts of this property overlap more or less with various protected areas like national parks, nature reserves, Natura 2000 network.
Abbreviations:
C – count of component parts in a given cluster
N – overlapping with Natura 2000 areas

Tentative list
This forest is placed on the World Heritage Tentative list as a proposal for the expansion of the Ancient and Primeval Beech Forests of the Carpathians and Other Regions of Europe site:

Montenegro
 Virgin Forest Reserve in NP Biogradska Gora

Serbia
 Fruška gora, Kopaonik, Tara

Gallery

Notes

References

External links

 
 Beauty and changes of Primeval beech forests throughout a year

Ecoregions of Europe
 
 
 
Forests of Albania
Old-growth forests
Protected areas of the Eastern Carpathians
Temperate broadleaf and mixed forests
Transboundary protected areas
World Heritage Sites in Albania
World Heritage Sites in Austria
World Heritage Sites in Belgium
World Heritage Sites in Bosnia and Herzegovina
World Heritage Sites in Bulgaria
World Heritage Sites in Croatia
World Heritage Sites in the Czech Republic
World Heritage Sites in France
World Heritage Sites in Germany
World Heritage Sites in Italy
World Heritage Sites in North Macedonia
World Heritage Sites in Poland
World Heritage Sites in Romania
World Heritage Sites in Slovakia
World Heritage Sites in Slovenia
World Heritage Sites in Spain
World Heritage Sites in Switzerland
World Heritage Sites in Ukraine